The Husky Heights are relatively flat, ice-covered heights  southeast of Haynes Table, overlooking the head of Brandau Glacier in the Queen Maud Mountains of Antarctica. They were named by the Advisory Committee on Antarctic Names in association with Husky Dome, the highest point on these heights.

References

Mountains of the Ross Dependency
Dufek Coast